Limavady railway station served Limavady in County Londonderry in Northern Ireland.

The Londonderry and Coleraine Railway opened the station on 29 December 1852.

It closed on 3 July 1950.

References

Disused railway stations in County Londonderry
Railway stations opened in 1852
Railway stations closed in 1950
1852 establishments in Ireland
Limavady

Railway stations in Northern Ireland opened in 1852